The 2021–22 season was the 110th season in the existence of FC Viktoria Plzeň and the club's 29th consecutive season in the top flight of Czech football. In addition to the domestic league, Viktoria Plzeň participated in this season's editions of the Czech Cup and the UEFA Europa Conference League.

Players

First-team squad
.

Out on loan

Transfers

Pre-season and friendlies

Competitions

Overall record

Czech First League

League table

Results summary

Results by round

Matches

Championship Group

Czech Cup

UEFA Europa Conference League

Qualifying rounds

Second qualifying round
The draw for the second qualifying round was held on 16 June 2021.

Third qualifying round
The draw for the third qualifying round was held on 19 July 2021.

Play-off round
The draw for the play-off round was held on 2 August 2021.

References

FC Viktoria Plzeň seasons
Viktoria Plzen
2021–22 UEFA Europa Conference League participants seasons
Czech Republic football championship-winning seasons